Silly may refer to:

Places
 Silly, Belgium, a town
 Silly Department, a department or commune of Sissili Province in southern Burkina Faso

Music
 Silly (band), an East German rock group from the 1970s
 The Sillies, an American punk rock band formed in 1977
 Silly (album), the 2008 debut album by Taiwanese singer and songwriter Queen Wei
 "Silly" (song), a 1981 song by Deniece Williams

People
 Gilbert Bécaud (1927–2001), born François Silly, French singer, composer, pianist and actor
 Gaylord Silly (born 1986), long distance runner from the Seychelles
 John Silly (died 1672), English politician and Member of Parliament
 Roland Silly, French trade unionist and politician, collaborator during the German World War II occupation of France

Other uses
 silly, the adjective of Silliness
 Silly, a fielding position in the sport of cricket
 the title character of Mr. Silly, the tenth book in the Mr. Men children's book series

See also
 Isles of Scilly, a UK archipelago
 Sili (disambiguation)